Bernt Harry Johansson (born 18 April 1953) is a Swedish former road bicycle racer, who was a professional rider from 1977 to 1981. His sporting career began with Mariestadcyklisten.  A competitor at the 1972 Summer Olympics, he represented his native country once again at the 1976 Summer Olympics in Montreal, Quebec, Canada, where he won the men's individual road race. For that performance Johansson was awarded the Svenska Dagbladet Gold Medal the same year, together with track and field athlete Anders Gärderud, who claimed gold in the men's 3000 m steeplechase in Montreal.

Career achievements

Major results

1972
 3rd Road race, National Road Championships
1973
 1st Stage 12 Tour d'Algérie
 2nd Overall Milk Race
1974
 1st  Team time trial, UCI Road World Championships (with Tord Filipsson, Lennart Fagerlund & Sven-Åke Nilsson)
 1st  Road race, National Road Championships
1975
 1st Overall Milk Race
1st Stage 8
1976
 1st  Road race, Summer Olympics
 1st Stages 7 & 12 Tour du Maroc
 1st Stage 7 Milk Race
1977
 1st  Overall Vuelta Ciclista a la Comunidad Valenciana
1st Stage 2
 1st Trofeo Baracchi (with Carmelo Barone)
 1st GP Forli
 2nd Giro dell'Emilia
 3rd Gran Piemonte
 3rd Trofeo Laigueglia
 3rd Giro del Veneto
 3rd GP Industria & Commercio di Prato
1978
 1st Gran Premio Industria e Commercio di Prato
 1st Giro dell'Emilia
 1st GP Forli
 1st Stage 1c (ITT) Cronostaffetta
 2nd Giro di Lombardia
 2nd Giro del Lazio
 3rd Trofeo Baracchi (with Gianbattista Baronchelli)
 3rd GP Lugano
 3rd Giro del Veneto
 4th Giro di Toscana
 4th Giro di Romagna
 5th Coppa Placci
 9th Overall Giro d'Italia
1979
 1st Gran Premio Industria e Commercio di Prato
 2nd Giro della Provincia di reggio Calabria
 3rd Overall Giro d'Italia
1st Stages 11 & 14
 3rd La Flèche Wallonne
 3rd Giro dell'Appennino
 3rd Coppa Placci
 4th Overall Giro di Puglia
 7th Giro di Romagna
 8th Giro del Lazio
1980
 1st Giro del Lazio
 2nd Overall Vuelta a Andalucía
1st Stage 5b
 4th Gran Piemonte
 4th Giro dell'Emilia
 6th Milano–Torino
 7th Overall Tirreno–Adriatico
 7th G.P. Camaiore
1981
 2nd Giro della Provincia di reggio Calabria

Grand Tour general classification results timeline

References

External links
 

1953 births
Living people
Sportspeople from Gothenburg
Swedish male cyclists
Cyclists at the 1972 Summer Olympics
Cyclists at the 1976 Summer Olympics
Swedish Giro d'Italia stage winners
Olympic cyclists of Sweden
Olympic gold medalists for Sweden
Olympic medalists in cycling
Medalists at the 1976 Summer Olympics
UCI Road World Champions (elite men)
20th-century Swedish people
21st-century Swedish people